Pony Malta, also known as Western-Rossin in 1987, was a Colombian professional cycling team that existed from 1987 to 1991.

The team competed in the 1991 Giro d'Italia and in two editions of the Vuelta a España, but had no stage victories in any.

References

Defunct cycling teams based in Colombia
1987 establishments in Colombia
1991 disestablishments in Colombia
Cycling teams established in 1987
Cycling teams disestablished in 1991
Cycling teams based in Colombia